Neo Geo Heroes: Ultimate Shooting (ネオジオ ヒーローズ ～アルティメット シューティング～) is a shooting game developed and published by SNK Playmore for the PlayStation Portable in 2010.

Gameplay
Players can choose to rotate action on the screen horizontally or vertically based on their preferences. This allows players to play their PSP in whatever two positions they desire.

A normal story in Story Mode consists of fifteen stages. Each story has multiple story paths and endings the players can now explore with each character. New stages have been made for this game as well.

Players can choose to test themselves in a Challenge Mode. Two known options is a survival mode against all the bosses, and a shooting mode that limits or tests the players for their best rankings.

Using wireless connection, two players can also stage multiplayer competitions with one another. The competition settings are the same as KOF Sky Stage. Since the game features the same characters as KOF Sky Stage, an option to play it is also available.

The Museum Mode features profile information and artwork for each character. It also features a sound select and rankings for the players to review.

Characters
Playable:
Athena Asamiya 
Terry Bogard
Mai Shiranui
Kyo Kusanagi
Iori Yagami 
Kula Diamond
Marco Rossi (from the Metal Slug series)
Akari Ichijo (from The Last Blade)
Iroha (from Samurai Shodown VI)
SYDIII Pilot - mysterious female character voiced by Megumi Toyoguchi, codenamed "UNI-008"; originated from Alpha Mission; pilots a SYD III ship

Non-playable:
Doctor Brown (from the World Heroes series)

Bosses:
Kusanagi (The King of Fighters)
Orochi Iori (The King of Fighters)
Rugal Bernstein (The King of Fighters)
Orochi Yashiro (The King of Fighters)
Goenitz (The King of Fighters)
Orochi Chris (The King of Fighters)
Orochi Shermie (The King of Fighters)
Orochi (The King of Fighters)
Omega Rugal (The King of Fighters)
Geo-Geegus (original character, based on Geegus/Neo Geegus from World Heroes)

Release
Consumers who reserved the product early received a sound CD featuring the original soundtrack for this game, the arranged soundtrack for KOF Sky Stage, and other music choices from other SNK shooting titles.

Reception

References

External links
Official website 

2010 video games
Scrolling shooters
Run and gun games
MOSS (company) games
SNK Playmore games
PlayStation Portable games
PlayStation Portable-only games
Video games developed in Japan
Video games featuring female protagonists
Crossover video games